Animal Icons (2004-2007) is a television show from Animal Planet about animals in popular culture. This program tells us about fictional animals from franchises that include Garfield, Godzilla, King Kong, Batman, Spider-Man and Bugs Bunny.

The episodes for example are:
 "It Came from Japan" - About Godzilla and all the Giant monsters of Japan
 "King Kong" - About King Kong the giant gorilla
 "Animated Animals" - About animated animals such as Bugs Bunny
 "Comic Book Creatures" - About fictional animals in comics like Batman and Spider-Man
 "Animal on Wheels" - About an auto species
 "Hollywood Horses" - About horses
 "Political Animals" - About animal symbols
 "Garfield" - About Garfield, one of the world's most famous fictional cats
 "Jaws" - About the great white shark in the Jaws movies
 "Christmas Animals" - About fictional animals during Christmas
 "Star Wars Creatures" - About fictional creatures in the Star Wars universe
 "Hollywood's Prehistoric Superstars" - About dinosaurs in movies
 "Primetime Pets" - About animals on prime time television

References

External links
 

Animal Planet original programming
2004 American television series debuts
2007 American television series endings
Television series about animals